Thin is a Burmese name that may refer to the following notable people:
Thin Thin (disambiguation), multiple people
Thin Sumbwegam (born 1930), Burmese long-distance runner
Aung Thin (1927–2014), Burmese writer 
Cherry Thin (born 1996), Burmese singer
Htoo Eain Thin (1963–2004), Burmese singer-songwriter
Nyo Nyo Thin (born 1967), Burmese lawyer and politician
Phyu Phyu Thin (born 1971), Burmese politician

See also

Thon (name)

Burmese names